The women's team competition at the 2010 European Judo Championships was held on 25 April at the Ferry-Dusika-Hallenstadion in Austria, Austria.

Results

Repechage

References

External links
 

Wteam
EU 2010
European Women's Team Judo Championships
Euro